Chalton is a small English village and former civil parish in the East Hampshire district of Hampshire. It is in the civil parish of Clanfield, 2.3 miles (3.7 km) north-east of Horndean and just east of the A3. The nearest railway station is 3.1 miles (5 km) south of the village, at Rowlands Castle.

Heritage
The village pub, The Red Lion, is believed to be the oldest in Hampshire, dating from the 16th century, though possibly earlier. The Church of England Parish Church of St. Michael and All Angels has a thirteenth-century chancel; the registers include burials in woollen cloth from 1678 to 1746. Clanfield and Chalton parishes were amalgamated 1932. Chalton was listed as part of the 'Hundred of Finchdean' in the Domesday Book.

On Windmill Hill, Hampshire near Chalton is Chalton Windmill which stands at 193 metres above sea level.
Also near Chalton, is Butser Ancient Farm and the area around Chalton is home to many ancient sites.

The Staunton Way footpath goes past Chalton from Queen Elizabeth Country Park which is close to the village.

The Admiralty Shutter Telegraph Line had a semaphore line station at Chalton.

Notable people
Chalton is where the satirist James Bramston was buried in 1743. Admiral Richard Goodwin Keats, famous for his actions at the Battle of Algeciras Bay in 1801 was born in Chalton in 1757.

References

External links

 Hampshire Treasures Volume 6 (East Hampshire) pages 89, 91, 92, 93, 94 and 95
 Stained Glass Windows at St. Michael Chalton, Hampshire
 Chalton Hampshire
 A history of Chalton

Villages in Hampshire
Former civil parishes in Hampshire